ISO 14155 Clinical investigation of medical devices for human subjects -- Good clinical practice

This international standard addresses good clinical practices for the design, conduct, recording and reporting of clinical investigations carried out in human subjects to assess the safety and performance of medical devices for regulatory purposes. However, it does not apply to in vitro diagnostic medical devices.

This standard was developed by ISO technical committee ISO/TC 194. ISO 14155 was published in its second edition in February 2011. The third edition was released in July 2020.

Edition and revision
The first edition of ISO 14155-1 was published on 15 February 2003. The second revision of the standard was released in February 2011, the third revision and therefore current version of the standard was released in July 2020, ISO 14155:2020.

Main requirements of the standard 
The ISO 14155 adopts the structure in the following breakdown:
 Scope
 Normative references
 Terms and definitions
 Ethical considerations
 Clinical investigation planning
 Clinical investigation conduct
 Suspension, termination and close-out of the clinical investigation 
 Responsibilities of the sponsor
 Responsibilities of the principal investigator

Assessment
The standard ISO 14155:2011 is an assessable standard and hence is certifiable. The standard regards good clinical practices and protocols for the clinical investigations and plans of medical devices. The assessment is carried out following defined protocols in this international standard.

Certification
Independent assessment bodies carry out independent assessments following auditing principles and practices and protocols in this International Standard.

History

See also
 Good clinical practice
 International Organization for Standardization
 List of International Organization for Standardization standards
 Nuremberg Code

References

External links 
  ISO 14155—Clinical investigation of medical devices for human subjects—Good clinical practice
 ISO 14155:2020 - Clinical investigation of medical devices for human subjects — Good clinical practice
 ISO TC 194—Biological and clinical evaluation of medical devices

Standards for electronic health records
14155